The Bogibeel Bridge is a combined road and rail bridge over the Brahmaputra River in the northeastern Indian state of Assam between Dhemaji district and Dibrugarh district, which was started in the year 2002 and took a total of 200 months to complete, Bogibeel river bridge is the longest rail-cum-road bridge in India, measuring 4.94 kilometres over the Brahmaputra river. As it is situated in an earthquake-prone area it is India's first bridge to have fully welded steel-concrete support beams that can withstand earthquakes of magnitudes up to 7 on the Richter scale. It is Asia's second longest rail-cum-road bridge and has a serviceable period of around 120 years.

It is the 5th longest bridge in India after Bhupen Hazarika Setu, Dibang River Bridge, Mahatma Gandhi Setu and Bandra–Worli Sea Link. The bridge was constructed by a consortium of construction companies headed by Hindustan Construction Company. The bridge has a double rail line on the lower deck and a three lane road on the upper deck. It was inaugurated by Prime Minister Narendra Modi on 25 December 2018 on the occasion of Good Governance Day.

Location 
The Bogibeel Bridge, situated 17 km downstream of Dibrugarh and Dhemaji, spans the Brahmaputra River and will connect the town of Dibrugarh in the south to Dhemaji to the river's north. The bridge is located just over 20 km away from the Assam- Arunachal Pradesh border and acts as an alternative to the Kolia Bhomora Setu, Tezpur in providing connectivity to nearly five million people residing in Upper Assam and Arunachal Pradesh.

The Bogibeel Bridge is the longest rail-cum-road bridge of India on the Brahmaputra River in Assam. Owing to its location, the bridge is of strategic importance to India as it significantly eases India's ability to transport troops and supplies to the border with Tibet in Arunachal Pradesh. Being located in an area of intense rainfall, its construction had been significantly slowed down by the fact that construction largely took place only during a period of four dry months between November and March.

Road connectivity
The bridge connects Dhemaji district and Dibrugarh district in Assam through National Highway 15.

Rail connectivity 
The Bogibeel Bridge provides a connection between the Rangiya–Murkongselek section of the Northeast Frontier Railway, located on the northern bank of the Brahmaputra River, and the Lumding–Dibrugarh section that lies to the southern bank. A New Dibrugarh Railway Station, expected to be the largest in the region, has been proposed and is to be linked to the Rangiya–Murkongselek line via Chaulkhowa and Moranhat. The Railways have initiated the gauge conversion of the Dhamalgaon to Sisiborgaon rail line to the north of the bridge and commissioned the 44 km Chalkhowa–Moranhat line to the south.

History 
The bridge traces its origins to the Assam Accord of 1985 and was one of several major infrastructural projects to be set up in Assam in accordance with the pact. It was sanctioned by the Government of India in 1997-98 and was expected to be completed by the end of the Ninth Five Year Plan. The foundation of the bridge was laid in January 1997 by Prime Minister H. D. Deve Gowda, but its construction was inaugurated only in 2002 by Prime Minister, A. B. Vajpayee. The project was to be completed in six years following the inauguration, however the work did not begin even in 2007, owing to lack of funds and attention. Consequently, that same year, the Bogibeel Bridge was granted a national project status by the Government of India in 2007 by Prime Minister Manmohan Singh, but the implementation was slow, notwithstanding a Congress government in Assam. Accordingly, the Union Ministry of Finance funded 75% of the project costs while the Ministry of Railways financed the rest. The actual work on the project only began in 2011.

In April 2008, the Northeast Frontier Railway contracted Gammon India to construct the sub-structure of the bridge while a consortium of Hindustan Construction Company, DSD Brückenbau GmbH, Germany and VNR Infrastructures won the bid to build the superstructure.

The bridge's construction was subject to large time and cost overruns over time. According to a press release by the Indian Ministry of Railway on 25 July 2014, in the main bridge 36 out of 42 well foundations and 28 out of 40 piers had been completed, while 2 out of 41 girders had been launched. However, a correspondent writing in The Hindu Business Line claimed that when he visited the project in July 2014, only 15 out of the 42 piers were "coming up", while the work on the rest had barely begun.

On 2 December 2018, the bridge opened as the first freight train crossed it. On 25 December, the Indian Prime Minister Narendra Modi inaugurated the Bogibeel bridge, on the birth anniversary of former Prime Minister Atal Bihari Vajpayee, and also flag off an intercity express connecting Tinsukia and Naharlagun.

Structure 
The design of the bridge has 41 spans of 125 m and a superstructure of composite welded steel truss and reinforced concrete. It is designed to be able to carry a double line  broad-gauge railway on the lower deck and a 3-lane road on the upper deck. Owing to its strategic importance, it was also built with supporting the movement of tanks and aircraft in mind. It is the longest combined rail and road bridge in India and second longest bridge in Assam over the Brahmaputra, after Bhupen Hazarika Setu at 9.15 km.

See also
 List of bridges on Brahmaputra River

References 

Railway bridges in India
Bridges in Assam
Bridges over the Brahmaputra River
Transport in Dibrugarh
Road bridges in India
Road-rail bridges in India
Bridges completed in 2018
2018 establishments in Assam
Dibrugarh district